In mineralogy, crystal habit is the characteristic external shape of an individual crystal or aggregate of crystals. The habit of a crystal is dependent on its crystallographic form and growth conditions, which generally creates irregularities due to limited space in the crystallizing medium (commonly in rocks).

Crystal forms
Recognizing the habit can aid in mineral identification and description, as the crystal habit is an external representation of the internal ordered atomic arrangement. Most natural crystals, however, do not display ideal habits and are commonly malformed. Hence, it is also important to describe the quality of the shape of a mineral specimen:

 Euhedral: a crystal that is completely bounded by its characteristic faces, well-formed. Synonymous terms: idiomorphic, automorphic;
 Subhedral: a crystal partially bounded by its characteristic faces and partially by irregular surfaces. Synonymous terms: hypidiomorphic, hypautomorphic;
 Anhedral: a crystal that lacks any of its characteristic faces, completely malformed. Synonymous terms: allotriomorphic, xenomorphic.

Altering factors

Factors influencing habit include: a combination of two or more crystal forms; trace impurities present during growth; crystal twinning and growth conditions (i.e., heat, pressure, space); and specific growth tendencies such as growth striations. Minerals belonging to the same crystal system do not necessarily exhibit the same habit. Some habits of a mineral are unique to its variety and locality: For example, while most sapphires form elongate barrel-shaped crystals, those found in Montana form stout tabular crystals. Ordinarily, the latter habit is seen only in ruby. Sapphire and ruby are both varieties of the same mineral: corundum.

Some minerals may replace other existing minerals while preserving the original's habit, i.e. pseudomorphous replacement. A classic example is tiger's eye quartz, crocidolite asbestos replaced by silica. While quartz typically forms prismatic (elongate, prism-like) crystals, in tiger's eye the original fibrous habit of crocidolite is preserved.

List of crystal habits

Aggregate habits

Asymmetrical/Irregular habits

Symmetrical habits

Rounded/Spherical habits

See also
Abnormal grain growth
Grain growth
Crystal structure

References

Crystallography
Mineralogy concepts
Mineral habits